The 2022–23 North Dakota Fighting Hawks basketball team represented the University of North Dakota in the 2022–23 NCAA Division I men's basketball season. The Fighting Hawks were led by fourth-year head coach Paul Sather and played their home games at the Betty Engelstad Sioux Center in Grand Forks, North Dakota, as members of the Summit League.

Previous Season
Under third-year head coach Paul Sather, the Fighting Hawks finished with a record of 6–25 (2–16 Summit) and finished 10th place in the Summit League.

Roster

Schedule and results

|-
!colspan=12 style=""| Exhibition

|-
!colspan=12 style=""| Non-conference regular season

|-
!colspan=12 style=| Summit League regular season

|-
!colspan=9 style=|Summit League tournament

References

North Dakota Fighting Hawks men's basketball seasons
North Dakota Fighting Hawks men's basketball
North Dakota Fighting Hawks men's basketball
North Dakota Fighting Hawks